"Slow Burn" is a song written by Tommy Rocco and Charlie Black, and recorded by American country music artist T. G. Sheppard.  It was released in September 1983 as the first single and title track from the album Slow Burn.

The song was Sheppard's 13th number one on the Billboard Hot Country Singles chart, and spent one week atop the chart as part of a 14-week run within the chart's Top 40.

Content
The song is about a deeply emotional but long-lasting love affair.

Single and album edits
The single edit has an earlier fade than the full album version.

Chart performance

Weekly charts

Year-end charts

References
 

1983 singles
1983 songs
T. G. Sheppard songs
Song recordings produced by Jim Ed Norman
Warner Records singles
Curb Records singles
Songs written by Charlie Black
Songs written by Tommy Rocco